Kyoko is a 1995 novel by Ryu Murakami. The book tells the story of a young woman who comes to New York City to find the Cuban-American GI who taught her to dance salsa. She ends up traveling throughout the United States to help her friend, who is dying of AIDS, see his family one last time, although he doesn't even remember her.

In the year 2000, a film was made from the story of this book, under the title Kyoko or, in English, Because of You, written and directed by the author, Ryu Murakami.

Publishing history 
 Publisher: Philippe Picquier (August 31, 2000). .

References

1995 Japanese novels
Novels by Ryū Murakami
Novels about HIV/AIDS
Japanese novels adapted into films